Robert Wringham (born Robert Westwood; 28 November 1982) is a British writer, best known for his humour collections and as the editor of New Escapologist magazine. His first humour collection, A Loose Egg, was shortlisted for the 2015 Leacock Medal.

Work

Wringham is primarily a humorist. In an article for the one-hundredth edition of Canadian Notes and Queries, he expressed a desire to be known as "the waster humorist." He also conveyed a belief in the social value of comic literature and an admiration for the work of Eric Nicol, Susan Juby, Paul Quarrington and Stuart McLean.

Wringham was the founder of New Escapologist, a lifestyle magazine that ran from 2007 to 2017. The magazine advocated the escape from conventional employment and some notable contributors were Alain de Botton, Will Self, Richard Herring, Ewan Morrison, Tom Hodgkinson, Luke Rhinehart and Caitlin Doughty. Wringham continues the magazine "out of love or maybe habit" as a newsletter and blog.

In 2012, Go Faster Stripe published Wringham's first non-fiction book You Are Nothing, which told the story of comedy troupe Cluub Zarathustra, whose members included Stewart Lee, Simon Munnery, Kevin Eldon, Julian Barratt, Graham Linehan, Sally Phillips and Johnny Vegas. The book is written from Wringham's outsider perspective and draws on conflicting interviews with cast and audience members.

2014 saw the publication of A Loose Egg, a collection of short pieces about Wringham's childhood, bachelorhood and early married life. In 2015, it was longlisted and finally shortlisted for the Leacock Medal.

In 2015, Wringham crowdfunded a New Escapologist-related book with publisher Unbound and the resulting Escape Everything! was released in 2016. A German edition called Ich Bin Raus was published in the same year and attracted considerable media attention. A follow-up title was commissioned called The Good Life for Wage Slaves, published by Heyne Verlag in Germany and independently in the UK. When Unbound republished Escape Everything! as a paperback in 2021, it was retitled I'm Out: How to Make an Exit.

He wrote a second humour collection (returning to Go Faster Stripe) with Stern Plastic Owl in 2021, explaining "I just want to write some carefree books for a special coterie of smartypantses," while announcing a first novel.

Wringham writes for Joshua Glenn's pop culture website HiLobrow, and had a column in the Idler magazine between 2016 and 2020.

Books
 You Are Nothing (2012) 
 A Loose Egg (2014) 
 Escape Everything! (2016) 
 I'm Out: How to Make an Exit (retitled paperback edition) (2021) 
 The Good Life for Wage Slaves (2020) 
 Stern Plastic Owl (2021) 
 Rub-a-Dub-Dub (announced)

Pseudonym

His pen name comes from James Hogg's Private Memoirs and Confessions of a Justified Sinner.

In The Good Life for Wage Slaves, Wringham explains that he'd been blogging under his original name since his early twenties but became self-conscious and in need of creative freedom when googling people became a common practice: "I didn't mind exposing my soul to a few strange nerds on the other side of the planet, but a certain dishonesty is required among friends, isn't it?"

Personal life

Originally from Dudley, Wringham moved to Glasgow in 2004. He is also a Resident of Canada.

In 2014 he married his long-term partner Samara, who appears as a foil in some of his writing.

References

External links 
Robert Wringham's website
Interview at the British Comedy Guide
 

1982 births
Alumni of the University of Wolverhampton
Alumni of the University of Strathclyde
English humorists
Living people
People from Dudley
British emigrants to Canada